Irrigon is a city in Morrow County, Oregon, United States, on the Columbia River and U.S. Route 730. The city is part of the Pendleton–Hermiston Micropolitan Statistical Area. The population was 1,826 at the 2010 census.

Irrigon was incorporated on February 28, 1957.

History
Irrigon is near the site of a former Columbia River landing called Grande Ronde Landing that vied with Umatilla Landing (Umatilla),  upriver, for water-transportation business. Umatilla Landing prospered, and Grande Ronde Landing did not; the latter was eventually renamed Stokes. In 1903, a newspaper editor, Addison Bennett, renamed the community Irrigon, a portmanteau assembled from Irrigation and Oregon. Bennett, who saw irrigation as important to business in the city, published its first newspaper, the Oregon Irrigator, later renamed the Irrigon Irrigator.

Stokes, the site of a railway station by that name, had a post office that operated from 1876 through 1899; Douglas W. Bailey served as postmaster. An Irrigon post office was established in 1903; Frank B. Holbrook was the first postmaster.

Economy and education
Irrigon is an agriculture- and food processing-based community. The largest employer is Western Alfalfa, a company that makes prepared livestock feeds.

Irrigon Junior/Senior High School, Irrigon Elementary School, A.C. Houghton Elementary School, and the Morrow Education Center, an alternative school, are in Irrigon. They are part of the Morrow County School District, which has its headquarters in Lexington.

In June 2014, the city made the news when it announced that it would pay a bounty of one dollar for each large trash bag of puncturevine, an invasive plant.

Geography

Climate
According to the Köppen Climate Classification system, Irrigon has a semi-arid climate, abbreviated "BSk" on climate maps.

Demographics

2010 census

As of the census of 2010, there were 1,826 people, 602 households, and 463 families residing in the city. The racial makeup of the city was 76.2% White, 0.4% African American, 1.4% Native American, 0.6% Asian, 0.1% Pacific Islander, 18.5% from other races, and 2.7% from two or more races. Hispanic or Latino of any race were 32.0% of the population.

There were 602 households, of which 44.0% had children under the age of 18 living with them, 58.0% were married couples living together, 11.1% had a female householder with no husband present, 7.8% had a male householder with no wife present, and 23.1% were non-families. 17.4% of all households were made up of individuals, and 6.4% had someone living alone who was 65 years of age or older. The average household size was 3.03 and the average family size was 3.43.

The median age in the city was 33.3 years. 31.9% of residents were under the age of 18; 7.6% were between the ages of 18 and 24; 26.3% were from 25 to 44; 23.2% were from 45 to 64; and 11.2% were 65 years of age or older. The gender makeup of the city was 49.2% male and 50.8% female.

2000 census
As of the census of 2000, there were 1,702 people, 565 households, and 441 families residing in the city. The population density was 1,376.5 people per square mile (530.0/km2). There were 609 housing units at an average density of 492.5 per square mile (189.6/km2). The racial makeup of the city was 72.91% White, 0.18% African American, 1.12% Native American, 0.41% Asian, 22.91% from other races, and 2.47% from two or more races. Hispanic or Latino of any race were 27.26% of the population.

There were 565 households, out of which 40.2% had children under the age of 18 living with them, 60.0% were married couples living together, 12.4% had a female householder with no husband present, and 21.8% were non-families. 16.5% of all households were made up of individuals, and 6.0% had someone living alone who was 65 years of age or older. The average household size was 3.01 and the average family size was 3.33.

In the city, the population was spread out, with 32.5% under the age of 18, 10.0% from 18 to 24, 27.1% from 25 to 44, 21.0% from 45 to 64, and 9.4% who were 65 years of age or older. The median age was 30 years. For every 100 females, there were 96.3 males. For every 100 females age 18 and over, there were 96.1 males.

The median income for a household in the city was $35,799, and the median income for a family was $35,573. Males had a median income of $29,435 versus $21,953 for females. The per capita income for the city was $14,600. About 12.9% of families and 13.8% of the population were below the poverty line, including 21.1% of those under age 18 and 5.9% of those age 65 or over.

See also

 List of cities in Oregon

References

External links

 Entry for Irrigon in the Oregon Blue Book
 Irrigon profile from the State of Oregon Infrastructure Finance Authority

1957 establishments in Oregon
Cities in Oregon
Pendleton–Hermiston Micropolitan Statistical Area
Cities in Morrow County, Oregon
Oregon populated places on the Columbia River
Populated places established in 1957